Andrea Carlson (born 1979) is a mixed-media American visual artist currently based in Chicago. She also maintains a studio space and has a strong artistic presence in Minneapolis–Saint Paul, Minnesota.

Education
Carlson is a descendant of the Grand Portage Band of the Minnesota Chippewa Tribe. She earned a BA in studio arts and American Indian studies (language emphasis route) from the University of Minnesota in 2003. She has stated that "the greatest gift I took from American Indian Studies is the Ojibwe Language." In 2005, she earned an MFA in Visual Studies from the Minneapolis College of Art and Design.

Art career 
Carlson draws from her Anishinaabe, French, and Scandinavian heritages as a basis for her highly stylized work. She utilizes her background to investigate themes like cultural use, culture and personality, and the inherent influence of storytelling. She was influenced by the Grand Portage Ojibwe artist George Morrison. Growing up, Carlson's father, a hyperrealist painter, taught her the "foundations of drawing and painting" before she could read. Her father's support of her early artistic endeavors gave her the confidence that "she would be understood, and her efforts would be taken seriously." 

Carlson creates much of her art on paper, using acrylic and oil paint, watercolor, gouache, pen and ink, graphite, and colored pencil to create her evocative and enigmatic tales. She frequently works on a wide scale, combining hyper-realistic photographs with indeterminate space or graphic patterning to produce a world that is both familiar and foreign.

Carlson also explores the role of the museum in the representation and interpretation of cultural objects. She has said that "By citing pieces from the museum's collection in my artwork, I appropriate those objects by drawing them into imagined landscapes. The museum is a landscape in its own right, fostering and assimilating objects foreign to itself." Carlson's work and writing challenges museums to evolve beyond long-standing Western institutional paradigms, and to grapple with their colonial past. She brings to light the tradition of museums acquiring objects and collections through invasion, conquest, and colonization. The holder will then explain the object's origins and cultural importance after it has been shown. "If you have everyone's objects, you have to tell the story for the objects, that's part of domination. We take museums as authority when often times they are relying on pretty fictitious information." 

Carlson has employed cannibalism as a metaphor for cultural consumption in her paintings' titles and imagery, naming her "Windigo Series" for an Anishinaabe winter cannibal that often misidentifies those it consumes. Her ongoing series, VORE, uses cannibalism as a metaphor for problems of ethnic exploitation, consumption, and assimilation in its work. Using various media on paper to create objects from museum collections that float over pop-art influenced ranges, while Carlson's own heritage is hinted at in the background. Her artworks are inspired by the narrative of an object and how these objects are used as surrogates for cultural communication, as seen in her series VORE, storytelling as a means of conveying power and authority.

Her work has exhibited widely while gaining support through several fellowships including the Minnesota State Arts Board (2006) and McKnight/MCAD Foundation Fellowship (2007-08). Carlson was a participant in Plug In ICA’s Summer Institute in 2010.

Themes 
Andrea Carlson has described her own art as commenting on “entangled cultural narratives and institutional authority … Indigenous Futurisms and assimilation metaphors in film.”

Andrea Carlson’s work focuses on how stereotypes prevail in American narratives of Indigenous peoples. She stated that these fictional ideas of who they should be makes it so, “[a]ny changes to that code render them ‘unauthentic’ and cultures are institutionally killed.”

For example, in her print Exit (2019, screenprint) Carlson has stated that the piece comments on a “deep-seated fear of losing cultural practices, languages and art forms,” as represented by the exit sign. Many of the symbols in the print also reference indigenous creations that have been wrongfully appropriated by people who did not originate from them.

Carlson was selected by a team of art-in-education researchers as an example of contemporary art by Ojibwe descendants. They noted that art like Carlson’s  “better contextualize Ojibwe people’s culturally acquired behaviors. …”

Carlson has long drawn visual influence from film and movie culture, and in some of her works, she plays with cinematic conventions, asks the audience to act as the viewfinder, and encourages viewers to reconsider what they're seeing and how they're seeing it.

Group exhibitions 
2020-21: Don't Let This Be Easy at Walker Art Center, Minneapolis, MN, -July 30, 2020-July 4, 2021
2019–21: Hearts of Our People: Native Women Artists, traveling exhibition, June 2 - August 18, 2019 at Minneapolis Institute of Art, Minneapolis, MN; September 27, 2019 - January 12, 2020 at Frist Art Museum, Nashville, TN; February 21 - May 17, 2020 at Renwick Gallery, Smithsonian American Art Museum, Washington, DC; June 27 - September 13, 2020 at Philbrook Museum of Art, Tulsa, OK.
 2018–19: Art for a New Understanding: Native Voices, 1950s to Now, Crystal Bridges Museum of American Art, Bentonville, AR

Collections  
Her work is included in the permanent collections of the Walker Art Center, Weisman Art Museum, the British Museum, and the National Gallery of Canada.

References 

1979 births
Living people
American people of Ojibwe descent
American women painters
Minneapolis College of Art and Design alumni
Painters from Minnesota
University of Minnesota alumni
Place of birth missing (living people)
21st-century American women artists
Artists from Chicago
Painters from Illinois
21st-century American painters